Kim In-soon (born April 5, 1957), known professionally as Insooni, is a South Korean singer who made her debut in 1978 as a member of Hee Sisters. Since then, she has recorded a total of 19 albums, 14 of them full-length albums. She is acclaimed as South Korea's R&B diva, having garnered a wide range of fans over her 41+ year career. She is one of the few South Korean singers to have performed at Carnegie Hall in New York City and has earned several top prizes from South Korean music awards. She is distinguished by her rich, throaty voice with wide vocal range on stage. She was born to a South Korean mother and an African American father, who served in the U.S. military in South Korea and was brought up by her mother alone, with the assistance of Pearl S. Buck International's child sponsorship program.

Early life and education
Insooni was born to a South Korean mother and an African American father in April 1957 in Pocheon, Gyeonggi Province and her upbringing was fraught with difficulties from discrimination against minorities, which was severe during this time in South Korea. Insooni has commented that "while attending school I felt like I was dirty compared to my classmates." In-Soon graduated from Cheongsan Middle School of Yeoncheon, Gyeonggi Province and having had enough of the difficulties did not continue her education through high school. She has said that overcoming the difficulties came by singing.

Career
In 1978, Insooni made her debut with the girl group Hee Sisters but South Korean public opinion doubted that a girl group could be successful in South Korea. The Hee sisters' time allowed Insooni to show off her skills such as eloquent dance but the interest she attracted was merely that of outward appearance. In 1980, Fate (인연), Insooni's solo release debuted. 1983, with the age of disco setting in, If it's night, every night (밤이면 밤마다), saw her release a hit that rose and remained at number 7 on KBS charts through 1984, she rose immensely in popularity.

She has also released a live album of Contemporary Christian Music, which was launched on August 11, 2006. It included Korean versions of the classic Christian songs "Amazing Grace" and "How Great Thou Art" (주 하나님 지으신 모든 세계), and other songs such as "Jesus" (찬양해) and "Through Christ".

In 2007, she got special attention for her performance of the song "A Goose's Dream".

Personal life
Insooni has one daughter, Saein Park, also known as Jasmine, born 1994, who attended Seoul International School as a high honor student and graduated from Stanford University. Her father is Park Kyung-bae. She is three quarter Korean and quarter African American.

Insooni is a Catholic. Her baptismal name is Cecilia.

Discography 
 Destiny (인연) (1980)
 The Person Who Has To Leave (떠나야할 그 사람) (1981)
 Only Sadness Remains (슬픔만 남아 있어요) (1982)
 At Night, Every Night-Desire (밤이면 밤마다／욕망) (1983)
 Beautiful Korea (아름다운 우리나라/여기가 어디냐) (1984)
 Letter Of Tears (눈물의편지) (1985)
 As Ever, The Distance (그 어느 거리로) (1988)
 Turning Point (1989)
 Woman (女子) (1991)
 Hits of Insooni Vol.1 (1992)
 The Queen Of Soul (1996)
 From Deep Within My Soul (가스펠 1) (1997)
 My Turn (2001)
 A To Z (2004)
 Remix Party with DJ Oga (2006)
 Goose’s Dream/ Dreaming for Everyone (2007)
 Anthology 97-08 (2008)
 Insooni (2009)
 Uppercut (2011)
 Legend (30th Anniversary Concert, 2 Discs) (2011)
 Umbrella (2013)
 Pinocchio (피노키오) (2015)

Filmography

Television shows

References

External links

Yonhap News: Mixed-race Korean singer inspired by U.S. football star Hines Ward

1957 births
Living people
South Korean Roman Catholics
South Korean people of African-American descent
South Korean rhythm and blues singers
20th-century South Korean women singers
21st-century South Korean women singers